Samuel Henrique dos Santos Eleotério (born 25 April 1990 in São Paulo), known as Samuel Santos, is a Brazilian professional footballer who plays as a right back for Londrina.

On 31 July 2016, Samuel Santos signed with Marítimo .

References

External links
 
 

1990 births
Living people
Brazilian footballers
Brazilian expatriate footballers
Sociedade Esportiva Palmeiras players
Mirassol Futebol Clube players
ABC Futebol Clube players
Associação Desportiva São Caetano players
Clube Atlético Bragantino players
Esporte Clube Santo André players
Botafogo Futebol Clube (SP) players
C.S. Marítimo players
Esporte Clube São Bento players
Figueirense FC players
Esporte Clube Juventude players
Albirex Niigata players
Primeira Liga players
J2 League players
Campeonato Brasileiro Série B players
Campeonato Brasileiro Série C players
Campeonato Brasileiro Série D players
Association football defenders
Expatriate footballers in Portugal
Expatriate footballers in Japan